O. P. Sharma may refer to:
 O. P. Sharma (magician) (1941/1942–2022), Indian magician
 O. P. Sharma (photographer) (born 1937), Indian photographer

See also
 Om Prakash Sharma (disambiguation)